Leela Punyaratabandhu is a Thai American cookbook author and food writer on Thai cuisine. Born in Bangkok, Punyaratabandhu is the author of SheSimmers and The Epestle blogs, and a contributor to Epicurious, Wall Street Journal, Serious Eats, and Food52. Punyaratabandhu's 2017 cookbook Bangkok: Recipes and Stories from the Heart of Thailand received the 2018 Art of Eating Prize.

Books 

 Simple Thai Food: Classic Recipes from the Thai Home Kitchen (2014)
 Bangkok: Recipes and Stories from the Heart of Thailand (2017)
 Flavors of the Southeast Asian Grill: Classic Recipes for Meats and Seafood Cooked over Charcoal (2020)

References 

Living people
Year of birth missing (living people)
American cookbook writers
American food writers
Leela Punyaratabandhu
Thai emigrants to the United States